Karl Quade competed for West Germany in the men's standing volleyball event at the 1988 Summer Paralympics, where he won a gold medal.

He also competed in athletics at the 1988 Summer Paralympics, placing 4th in the men's shot put event for the A6 / A8 / A9 / L6 classifications.

Dr. Karl Quade started after retire as an athlete a career as a functionary. Since 1995 he is in the board of NPC Germany. In 1996 he startet his career as the Chef de Mission of the Germany Paralympic Team. In Beijing he will be the Chef de Mission of the German Paralympics for the fourteens time. He is also the Head of the Department "Para-Sport" in the Club TSV Bayer 04 Leverkusen with famose athletes like Markus Rehm, Irmgard Bensusan and Johannes Floors.

Dr. Karl Quade is a Scientist in Exercise Physiology and Biomechanics. In 1993 he got his PhD with the topic "Load and Function of lower extremities in volleyballspecific jumps". From 1989 he worked for 26 years in the Federal Institute of Sport Science in Germany (Cologne and Bonn), at the end as the deputy Director and Head of the Department "Scientific Research". In 2015 he moved into the Federal Ministry of Interior (Berlin) and was until his retirement in 2021 responsible for the international Sport Relations.

See also 
 West Germany at the 1988 Summer Paralympics

References

External links 
 Karl Quade at World ParaVolley

Living people
Year of birth missing (living people)
Place of birth missing (living people)
German men's volleyball players
Paralympic gold medalists for West Germany
Paralympic medalists in volleyball
Athletes (track and field) at the 1988 Summer Paralympics
Volleyball players at the 1988 Summer Paralympics
Medalists at the 1988 Summer Paralympics
German male shot putters
Shot putters with limb difference
Paralympic shot putters